The First Lapwai Bank, at 302 W. 1st St. in Lapwai, Idaho, was built in 1909.  It was listed on the National Register of Historic Places in 1980.

The building no longer exists.

References

National Register of Historic Places in Nez Perce County, Idaho
Buildings and structures completed in 1909
Bank buildings on the National Register of Historic Places in Idaho